Common names: transdanubian sand viper.

Vipera ammodytes montandoni is a venomous viper subspecies endemic to Bulgaria and southern Romania.

Etymology
The subspecific name, montandoni, is in honor of "M. A. Montandon" who sent some of the first specimens of this snake to Boulenger.

Description
According to Boulenger (1913): "Naso-rostral shield never reaching the canthus rostralis nor the summit of the rostral shield, which is deeper than broad (once and one seventh to once and a half); rostral appendage clad with 10-14 scales, in three (rarely two or four) transverse series between the rostral shield and the apex. Dorsal scales in 21 rows [at midbody]. Ventral shields 149 to 158; subcaudals 30 to 38. A more or less distinct blotch on the lower lip, involving five to seven labial shields without complete interruption. Lower surface of end of tail yellow."

Geographic range
Bulgaria and southern Romania.

References

Further reading
Boulenger GA. 1904. On the Sand-Viper of Roumania (Vipera ammodytes var. Montandoni ). Ann. Mag. Nat. Hist., Seventh Series 14: 134-135.

External links
 

ammodytes montandoni
Reptiles described in 1904